Muradalılı (also, Muradally) is a village and municipality in the Imishli Rayon of Azerbaijan.  It has a population of 799.

References 

Populated places in Imishli District